Maria Semenovna Galina (born 10 November 1958) is a Russian writer, living in Ukraine.

Life 
She was born in Kalinin (now the city of Tver) and studied marine biology in Odessa. She studied at the  University of Bergen, studying salmon.

She started publishing fiction in the 1990s under the pseudonym Maxim Golitsyn. She has since published novels under her own name as well. Two of her novels, Little Boondock and Mole-Crickets, were nominated for the Big Book Award in 2009 and 2012. She is also a prize-winning poet and literary critic, writing regular columns for the literary journal Novy Mir. She was a columnist for Literatunaya Gazeta. She and was editor of Drugaya Storona. Her work appeared in Russian Life.

She has mentioned being influenced by Dmitry Bykov, Oleg Ladyzhensky, Oleg Divov, Mikhail Uspensky, and Yevgeny Lukin.

Her novel Iramifictions was translated into English by Amanda Love Darragh and published under the Glas New Russian Writing imprint. Her translated poetry has appeared The Cafe Review and Matter. 

She lived and worked in Moscow. She moved to Odessa.

Works 

 Iramifications : a novel, Northwestern University Press, 2008. 
 Autochtones, Agullo, 2020. 
 Медведки роман, Moskva : Èksmo, 2011. 
 Волчья звезда  Moskva : AST, 2015.

References

Russian writers
1958 births
Living people